Biggs (formerly, Biggs Station) is a city in Butte County, California, United States. The population was 1,707 at the 2010 census, down from 1,793 at the 2000 census. The 2018 population estimate is 1,724.

Geography 
Biggs is located at  (39.413820, -121.710316).

History
A post office was established at Biggs Station in 1871, and the name changed to Biggs in 1884.  It was incorporated in 1903. Biggs is named for Maj. Marion Biggs, who first shipped grain by rail from the town's location.

In 1877, ancestors of the scientist Linus Pauling left Missouri and travelled to California, where they lived for a time in Biggs, "a settlement composed mostly of Germans" (the ancestors in question were themselves of German descent).

In late 2002, the town's mayor received a letter from Jeff Manning, executive director of the California Milk Processor Board, proposing that the town change its name to "Got Milk?".  The town council of Biggs subsequently rejected the proposal.

As of 2019, Biggs has been declared a sister city to Woburn, MA by the mayor of Woburn—Ralph Grande.

Demographics

2010
At the 2010 census Biggs had a population of 1,707. The racial makeup of Biggs was 1,302 (76.3%) White, 11 (0.6%) African American, 54 (3.2%) Native American, 9 (0.5%) Asian, 1 (0.1%) Pacific Islander, 252 (14.8%) from other races, and 78 (4.6%) from two or more races. Hispanic or Latino of any race were 580 people (34.0%).

The whole population lived in households, no one lived in non-institutionalized group quarters and no one was institutionalized.

There were 565 households, 246 (43.5%) had children under the age of 18 living in them, 315 (55.8%) were opposite-sex married couples living together, 90 (15.9%) had a female householder with no husband present, 39 (6.9%) had a male householder with no wife present.  There were 48 (8.5%) unmarried opposite-sex partnerships, and 2 (0.4%) same-sex married couples or partnerships. 94 households (16.6%) were one person and 41 (7.3%) had someone living alone who was 65 or older. The average household size was 3.02.  There were 444 families (78.6% of households); the average family size was 3.37.

The age distribution was 480 people (28.1%) under the age of 18, 185 people (10.8%) aged 18 to 24, 393 people (23.0%) aged 25 to 44, 463 people (27.1%) aged 45 to 64, and 186 people (10.9%) who were 65 or older.  The median age was 35.1 years. For every 100 females, there were 94.6 males.  For every 100 females age 18 and over, there were 89.9 males.

There were 617 housing units at an average density of ,of which 565 were occupied, 392 (69.4%) by the owners and 173 (30.6%) by renters.  The homeowner vacancy rate was 3.2%; the rental vacancy rate was 6.5%.  1,165 people (68.2% of the population) lived in owner-occupied housing units and 542 people (31.8%) lived in rental housing units.

2000
At the 2000 census there were 1,793 people in 571 households, including 449 families, in the city. The racial makeup of the city was 74.51% White, 0.45% Black or African American, 1.84% Native American, 0.84% Asian, 18.52% from other races, and 3.85% from two or more races. Hispanic or Latino of any race were 27.55%.

Of the 571 households 44.5% had children under the age of 18 living with them, 60.6% were married couples living together, 13.3% had a female householder with no husband present, and 21.2% were non-families. 17.2% of households were one person and 8.9% were one person aged 65 or older.  The average household size was 3.14 and the average family size was 3.55.

The age distribution was 34.2% under the age of 18, 8.9% from 18 to 24, 29.3% from 25 to 44, 17.1% from 45 to 64, and 10.5% 65 or older.  The median age was 30 years. For every 100 females, there were 90.5 males.  For every 100 females age 18 and over, there were 87.6 males.

The median income for a household in the city was $33,250, and the median family income  was $39,063. Males had a median income of $32,692 versus $22,500 for females. The per capita income for the city was $12,386.  About 11.7% of families and 17.5% of the population were below the poverty line, including 20.7% of those under age 18 and 14.0% of those age 65 or over.

Education
Biggs's public schools are operated by the Biggs Unified School District. The public schools in the Biggs Unified School District are Biggs Elementary School, Richvale Elementary School and Biggs High School.

References 

Incorporated cities and towns in California
Cities in Butte County, California
1903 establishments in California